Bartosiewicz is a surname of Polish-language origin. It may refer to:

 Bohdan Bartosiewicz (1918–2015), Polish basketball and volleyball player and coach
 Edyta Bartosiewicz (born 1965), Polish rock singer, composer and songwriter
 Oliwia Bartosiewicz (born 2001), Polish rapper and singer
 Peter Bartosiewicz (born 1942), pair skater who competed for Czechoslovakia
 Thomas J. Bartosiewicz (born 1948), New York state senator 1976–1988

See also 
 Bartoszewicz

Polish-language surnames